Inge Feltrinelli (née Schönthal; 24 November 1930 – 20 September 2018) was a German-born Italian photographer and director, who with her son Carlo ran the Italian publishing house Giangiacomo Feltrinelli Editore.

Biography
Inge Schönthal was born on 24 November 1930, before her father, who was of Jewish descent, moved to the Netherlands in 1938. Her Jewish background led to her expulsion from a Gymnasium (secondary school) in Göttingen.

After World War II ended, she began her career as photographer in Hamburg. In 1952, during a long stay in New York City, she was able to photograph Greta Garbo, Elia Kazan, John Fitzgerald Kennedy and Winston Churchill. She also made friends with Erwin Blumenfeld. Among her most celebrated photos are those of writers Ernest Hemingway, Edoardo Sanguineti, Allen Ginsberg, Günter Grass, Nadine Gordimer and artists Pablo Picasso and Marc Chagall.

She met Italian left-wing publisher Giangiacomo Feltrinelli in 1958, whom she later married in Mexico and followed to Milan (he had two previous marriages). She took charge of international relations for the publishing house and eventually became the de facto head of the publishing house, as Feltrinelli a few years later embraced the "struggle for the revolution against imperialism". 

In 1969, she was named vice-president in a company restructure decided by Feltrinelli (who remained President in name only) in anticipation of his transition to clandestine activities. When her husband died three years later, during an attempted terrorist attack on the Milan electricity network, she became president of the company, which she led together with her son Carlo. Later, she was emotionally engaged to the famous argentine designer and artist Tomas Maldonado.

Publications

References

Further reading
 Knigge, Jobst C.. Feltrinelli – Sein Weg in den Terrorismus, Humboldt Universitaet Berlin 2010
 Scarzella, Luca & Fiori, Simonetta (2010), "Inge film" DVD and book, Feltrinelli, Milano 

1930 births
2018 deaths
Italian photographers
Italian women photographers
Italian publishers (people)
Businesspeople from Göttingen
Italian people of Jewish descent
Italian people of German descent
Knights Grand Cross of the Order of Merit of the Italian Republic